Alexander Cairns (1878–1968) was a Scotland international rugby union player

Rugby Union career

Amateur career 

Cairns played for Watsonians. He was nicknamed Fatty.

Provincial career 

He was capped by Edinburgh District in 1902 playing in the Inter-City match against Glasgow District.

International career 

He was capped 12 times for the Scotland international side, from 1903 to 1906.

References 

1878 births
1968 deaths
Edinburgh District (rugby union) players
Rugby union players from Hamilton, South Lanarkshire
Scotland international rugby union players
Scottish rugby union players
Watsonians RFC players
Rugby union forwards